The 2020–21 Basketball League of Serbia is the 15th season of the Basketball League of Serbia, the top-tier professional basketball league in Serbia. Also, it's the 77th national championship played by Serbian clubs inclusive of the nation's previous incarnations as Yugoslavia and Serbia & Montenegro.

The season is the first to be played after the previous season was abandoned due to the COVID-19 pandemic in Serbia. The Basketball Federation of Serbia ruled that the 13 teams from the previous season will stay in the league and the three highest-placed clubs from Second League will be promoted. The first-placed team from the previous season, Borac, joins the ABA League. Crvena zvezda mts is the defending champion.

The First League began on 25 September 2020. The SuperLeague will start in May 2021.

Teams 
A total of 21 teams participated in the 2020–21 Basketball League of Serbia.

Distribution
The following is the access list for this season.

Promotion and relegation 
 Teams promoted from the Second League
 Radnički Kragujevac
 Sloga 
 Pirot 

 Teams relegated to the Second League
 None

Venues and locations

Regular season
The 2020–21 regular season began on 25 September 2020.

Personnel and sponsorship

Coaching changes

Standings

Super League
The Super League was canceled and the qualified teams were played in the Playoffs.

Qualified teams

Personnel and sponsorship

Coaching changes

Playoffs

The playoffs are scheduled to start on May 27, 2021 and end on June 13, 2021.

Bracket

Quarterfinals

Semifinals

Finals

Serbian clubs in European competitions

See also
List of current Basketball League of Serbia team rosters
2020–21 Second Men's League of Serbia (basketball)
2020–21 Radivoj Korać Cup
2020–21 ABA League First Division
2020–21 ABA League Second Division
2020–21 First Women's Basketball League of Serbia
 2020–21 KK Crvena zvezda season
 2020–21 KK Partizan season

References

External links
 Official website 
 League at srbijasport.net

Basketball League of Serbia seasons
Serbia
Basketball